Brief Crossing is a French film released in 2001 and directed by Catherine Breillat. It stars Sarah Pratt and Gilles Guillain.

The movie explores the viewpoints of two people at different stages in their lives and their attitudes toward sex and relationships. A virgin teenage boy with an eager, optimistic view of sex and an older woman who holds a bitter view of relationships meet on a ferry. She tells him she has just left her husband. They talk and become physically and emotionally intimate. At the end of the crossing, the boy sees the woman get into a car with her husband and children and realizes he had been lied to.

Production
Gilles Guillain was 18 at the time of filming, but still a virgin according to the director Catherine Breillat. In his sex scene with Sarah Pratt, Breillat told her head cameraman that all the sequence had to be filmed once, there had to be no repetition, because what would happen the first time would be "something really upsetting".

References

External links
 

2001 drama films
2001 films
Films directed by Catherine Breillat
French drama films
2000s French films